Geir Lundestad (born January 17, 1945) is a Norwegian historian, who until 2014 served as the director of the Norwegian Nobel Institute when Olav Njølstad took over. In this capacity, he also served as the secretary of the Norwegian Nobel Committee. However, he is not a member of the committee itself.

Born in Sulitjelma, Lundestad studied history at the University of Oslo and University of Tromsø, graduating in 1970 with a cand.philol. degree and in 1976 with a doctorate respectively. From 1974 to 1990, he held various positions as Lecturer and Professor at the University of Tromsø before beginning his positions with the Norwegian Nobel Institute and Committee. Subsequently, he has been associated with the University of Oslo as an Adjunct Professor of International History. Lundestad spent several years in the United States as a research fellow, at Harvard University, from 1978 to 1979 and again in 1983, and at the Woodrow Wilson Center in Washington, D.C., between 1988 and 1989. 

He is a member of the Norwegian Academy of Science and Letters.

Select bibliography 
 International Relations Since the end of the Cold War. New & Old Dimensions in International Relations. (edited by Lundestad, Oxford, 2013)
 The Rise and Decline of the American "Empire". Power and its Limits in Comparative Perspective. (Oxford, 2012)
 The American Non-Policy Towards Eastern Europe  1943–1947. (Oslo, New York City, 1975, reprinted 1978)
 America, Scandinavia, and the Cold War 1945–1949. (New York City, Oslo, 1980)
 East, West, North, South: Major Developments in International Politics Since 1945. (Oslo - Oxford, 1987, updated in 1991, 1996, 1999, 2004, 2010 and 2014) English, Norwegian, Swedish, Russian, Chinese and Turkish editions.
 The American "Empire" and Other Studies of US Foreign Policy in Comparative Perspective. (Oxford - Oslo, 1990)
Beyond the Cold War: New Dimensions in International Relations. (edited with Odd Arne Westad, Oslo - Oxford, 1993)
The Fall of Great Powers, Peace, Stability, and Legitimacy. (edited by Lundestad, Oxford - Oslo, 1994)
"Empire " by Integration: The United States and European Integration 1945–1997. (Oxford, 1998.) Japanese edition 2005.
No End to Alliance. The United States and Western Europe: Past, Present, and Future. (edited by Lundestad, Macmillan 1998.)
'Imperial Overstretch', Mikhail Gorbachev, and the End of the Cold War (edited by Lundestad, 2000)
“The Nobel Peace Prize” in Agneta Wallin Levinovitz and Nils Ringertz, eds., The Nobel Prize. The First 100 Years.  (London – Singapore, 2001).
War and Peace in the 20th Century and Beyond . (edited with Olav Njølstad, Singapore, 2002)
The United States and Western Europe Since 1945: From “Empire” by Invitation to Transatlantic Drift. (Oxford, 2003, paperback 2005), Norwegian edition 2004.
Just Another Major Crisis? The United States and Europe Since 2000. (edited by Lundestad, Oxford 2008)

References

External links
CV, nobelprize.org
Interview, 2005.

1945 births
Living people
Historians of Europe
20th-century Norwegian historians
Cold War historians
Harvard University staff
Members of the Norwegian Academy of Science and Letters
People from Bodø
21st-century Norwegian historians